Gif-sur-Yvette station (French: Gare de Gif-sur-Yvette) is an RER B station in Gif-sur-Yvette, near Paris, France.
It is one of two stations in Gif-sur-Yvette, the other is Courcelle-sur-Yvette.

Freight traffic through Gif-sur-Yvette ended in 1972. An underpass was built in 1977 to connect the two platforms.
In 2008/2009, an elevator was constructed to allow disabled access.

Connections
 Noctilien : N122
 SAVAC (bus) : Mobicaps n°10 & Mobicaps n°11

Réseau Express Régional stations
Railway stations in Essonne
Railway stations in France opened in 1867